2011 submarine cable disruption refers to two incidents of submarine communications cables cut off on 25 December 2011. The first cut off occurred to SEA-ME-WE 3 at Suez canal, Egypt and the second cut off occurred to i2i which took place between Chennai, India and Singapore line. Both the incidents had caused the internet disruptions and slowdowns for users in the South Asia and Middle East in particular UAE.

See also
2008 submarine cable disruption

References List

Submarine cable disruption
Submarine cable disruption
Submarine communications cables
Technological failures
December 2011 events
2010s internet outages